Club Deportivo Burela Fútbol Sala is a futsal club based in Burela, province of Lugo, in the northwestern autonomous community of Galicia.

The club was founded in 2001 as a split-off of A Mariña FS. The club plays its home games in Pavillón Vista Alegre with capacity of 1,400 seaters.

Sponsors
Conservas de Burela - (2001–2002)
Pescados Rubén - (2002–)

Season to season

6 seasons in Primera División
11 seasons in Segunda División
1 seasons in Segunda División B
1 seasons in Tercera División

Current squad

Miscellaneous
It is the only club with two teams in every professional league (men's and women's).
Ronaldinho is an honorary member of CD Burela FS.

References

External links
Official website
Profile at LNFS.es

Futsal clubs in Galicia (Spain)
Futsal clubs established in 2001
2001 establishments in Spain